The Municipality of Moravče is a municipality in the traditional region of Upper Carniola in central Slovenia. The seat of the municipality is the town of Moravče. Moravče became a municipality in 1994.

Settlements
In addition to the municipal seat of Moravče, the municipality also includes the following settlements:

 Češnjice pri Moravčah
 Dešen
 Dole pod Sveto Trojico
 Dole pri Krašcah
 Drtija
 Dvorje
 Gabrje pod Limbarsko Goro
 Gora pri Pečah
 Gorica
 Goričica pri Moravčah
 Hrastnik
 Hrib nad Ribčami
 Imenje
 Katarija
 Krašce
 Križate
 Limbarska Gora
 Mošenik
 Negastrn
 Peče
 Ples
 Podgorica pri Pečah
 Podstran
 Pogled
 Pretrž
 Prikrnica
 Rudnik pri Moravčah
 Selce pri Moravčah
 Selo pri Moravčah
 Serjuče
 Soteska pri Moravčah
 Spodnja Dobrava
 Spodnja Javoršica
 Spodnji Prekar
 Spodnji Tuštanj
 Stegne
 Straža pri Moravčah
 Sveti Andrej
 Velika Vas
 Vinje pri Moravčah
 Vrhpolje pri Moravčah
 Zalog pri Kresnicah
 Zalog pri Moravčah
 Zgornja Dobrava
 Zgornja Javoršica
 Zgornje Koseze
 Zgornji Prekar
 Zgornji Tuštanj

References

External links

Municipality of Moravče on Geopedia
Moravče municipal site

 
Moravče
1994 establishments in Slovenia